Pierre-Étienne Flandin (12 April 1889 – 13 June 1958) was a French conservative politician of the Third Republic, leader of the Democratic Republican Alliance (ARD), and Prime Minister of France from 8 November 1934 to 31 May 1935.

A military pilot during World War I, Flandin held a number of cabinet posts during the interwar period. He was Minister of Commerce, under the premiership of Frédéric François-Marsal, for just five days in 1924. He was Minister of Commerce and Industry in the premierships of André Tardieu in 1931 and 1932. Between those posts, he served under Pierre Laval as Finance Minister. In 1934 (6 February to 8 November), he was Minister of Public Works in the second cabinet of Gaston Doumergue. He became Prime Minister in November 1934, but his premiership lasted only until June 1935. However, a number of important pacts were negotiated during his term: the Franco–Italian Agreement, the Stresa Front and the Franco-Soviet Pact. Flandin was, at 45, the youngest prime minister in French history.

Flandin was the French Foreign Minister when Adolf Hitler ordered the Wehrmacht to reoccupy the Rhineland on 7 March 1936. Supporting appeasement during the Munich crisis hurt his career. In December 1940, Vichy Chief of State Philippe Pétain appointed Flandin Foreign Minister and Prime Minister on 13 December 1940, replacing Pierre Laval. He occupied that position for only two months.

He was ousted by François Darlan in January 1941.

A street in Avallon was named in his honour. In May 2017, it was renamed in honour of the murdered British MP, Jo Cox.

Flandin's ministry, 8 November 1934 – 1 June 1935
Pierre Étienne Flandin – President of the Council
Georges Pernot – Vice President of the Council and Minister of Justice
Pierre Laval – Minister of Foreign Affairs
Louis Maurin – Minister of War
Marcel Régnier – Minister of the Interior
Louis Germain-Martin – Minister of Finance
Paul Jacquier – Minister of Labour
François Piétri – Minister of Military Marine
William Bertrand – Minister of Merchant Marine
Victor Denain – Minister of Air
André Mallarmé – Minister of National Education
Georges Rivollet – Minister of Pensions
Émile Casset – Minister of Agriculture
Louis Rollin – Minister of Colonies
Henri Roy – Minister of Public Works
Henri Queuille – Minister of Public Health and Physical Education
Georges Mandel – Minister of Posts, Telegraphs, and Telephones
Paul Marchandeau – Minister of Commerce and Industry
Édouard Herriot – Minister of State
Louis Marin – Minister of State

References

External links
 

1889 births
1958 deaths
Politicians from Paris
Democratic Republican Alliance politicians
Prime Ministers of France
Transport ministers of France
French Ministers of Commerce and Industry
French Ministers of Posts, Telegraphs, and Telephones
French Ministers of Finance
Members of the 11th Chamber of Deputies of the French Third Republic
Members of the 12th Chamber of Deputies of the French Third Republic
Members of the 13th Chamber of Deputies of the French Third Republic
Members of the 14th Chamber of Deputies of the French Third Republic
Members of the 15th Chamber of Deputies of the French Third Republic
Members of the 16th Chamber of Deputies of the French Third Republic
French residents-general in Tunisia
People of Vichy France
French military personnel of World War I